Guntakal Junction railway station (station code: GTL) is located in Anantapur district in the Indian state of Andhra Pradesh and serves Guntakal. It is also the headquarters of Guntakal railway division in South Coast Railway. It is a junction station at the intersection point of the Mumbai–Chennai line, the Vijayawada–Marmagova line and the Guntakal–Bengaluru line.

History 
During the period 1861–1871 Madras Railway extended its Chennai–Arakkonnam line to Raichuru to join the Great Indian Peninsula Railway line, thereby linking Mumbai and Chennai with a  broad gauge line in 1871.

During 1888 to 1890 Southern Maharathna Railway developed a metre-gauge line from Vijayawada to Marmagova, passing through Guntakal.

The Guntakal–Bangalore line was opened in 1892–93. The metre-gauge Guntakal–Mysore Frontier Railway was opened in 1893. It was operated by Southern Maharathna Railway.

Electrification 
Electrification of Guntakal–Reniguntla section of 310 route km completed in 2013.
Electrification of Guntakal–Bangalore section of 293 route km completed in 2016.
Electrification of Guntakal–Wadi section of 228 route km completed in 2017.
Electrification of Guntakal–Gunturu section of 430 route km has been completed in 2018

Sheds 
Diesel Loco Shed, Guntakal was started as a metre-gauge shed but after gauge conversions in Guntakal and Hubballi divisions a broad-gauge shed was opened in 1995. It houses WDM-2, WDM-3A, WDM-3D, WDG-3A, WDG-3A and WDG-4 locos.  There is a coaching maintenance depot at Guntakal. Since after overhaul with electric traction, Indian Railways also sanctioned electric loco shed and it holds WAG-7 class locomotives.

Classification 

Guntakal Junction is classified as an A–category station in the Guntakal railway division. Guntakal has been selected for the Adharsa Station Scheme, a scheme for upgradation of stations by the Indian Railways.

References 

Railway stations in Anantapur district
Railway junction stations in Andhra Pradesh
Guntakal railway division
Railway stations opened in 1872
1872 establishments in India
Transport in Guntakal